Richard Kirman Sr. (January 14, 1877 – January 19, 1959) was an American politician. He was the 17th Governor of Nevada from 1935 to 1939. He was a member of the Democratic Party.

Biography
Kirman was born in Virginia City, Nevada, and educated in the Nevada public schools. He graduated from Lincoln High School in San Francisco, California. In San Francisco, on January 19, 1898, he married Mabelle Jean King and the couple had two children, Richard and Claire.

Career
Returning to Nevada, Kirman began working in banking. He was elected to the Nevada State Assembly in 1899. In 1902, he was appointed a member of the Board of Regents of the University of Nevada and was in that position until 1904.

Elected mayor of Reno, Nevada, Kirman served in that position from 1907 to 1909. He successfully served as President of Reno's First National Bank during the Great Depression. He continued all his life to be active in livestock, business and banking.

Winning the Democratic gubernatorial nomination in 1934, Kirman won the election and was sworn in as Governor of Nevada on January 7, 1935.  Nevada's state park system was created during Kirman's administration. Also, during his tenure, the state planning board was implemented, and construction on the Hoover Dam was completed. He did not seek re-election in 1938.

Death
Kirman died on January 19, 1959, in Carson City, Nevada, at the age of 82. He is interred at Mountain View Cemetery in Reno, Nevada.

References

External links
 
National Governors Association
The Political Graveyard
Nevada's First Ladies

1877 births
1959 deaths
Democratic Party governors of Nevada
Mayors of Reno, Nevada
Democratic Party members of the Nevada Assembly
People from Virginia City, Nevada